Mohammad Wahidul Haque is former Army and police officer. He is the former Director General of National Security Intelligence, the main civilian intelligence agency of Bangladesh.

Career 

Haque received commission in the Pakistan Army in 1966. In 1971, Haque was an officer, Captain, of Pakistan Army stationed in Rangpur Cantonment, East Pakistan. He was the adjutant of the 29th Cavalry Regiment. After the start of Bangladesh Liberation war in March 1971, his unit launched a crackdown on protests killing many. He was transferred to West Pakistan. After the Independence of Bangladesh in 1971, he returned to Bangladesh and joined Bangladesh Army in 1973. He was sent to forced retirement from the Army.

In October 1976, Haque joined Bangladesh Police with the rank of Assistant Superintendent. In 1988, he was appointed the Commissioner of Chittagong Metropolitan Police. In 1991, he was appointed Director of National Security Intelligence. In 1996 he became the acting Director General of National Security Intelligence. He served in that capacity till 1997 when he was made the Director General of Department of Immigration and Passports. He appointment was re-confirmed and extended in 2002. In October 2005, he retired from active duty with the rank of additional inspector general of police.

On 24 April 2018, Haque was arrested from his residence in Baridhara DOHS over in the role in the Bangladesh Genocide during the Bangladesh Liberation war. Investigation in the massacre of Bengali and Santal civilians by soldiers based in Rangpur cantonment began in 2016. On 16 October 2019, the International Crimes Tribunal ordered the beginning of his criminal trial for war crimes. He pleaded not guilty to the charges.

References 

Living people
Bangladesh Army officers
Pakistan Army officers
Bangladeshi police officers
Directors General of National Security Intelligence
Year of birth missing (living people)